SV Werder Bremen Frauen is SV Werder Bremen's women's football section, currently competing in the Frauen-Bundesliga of Germany. In 2014–15 they were promoted to the Bundesliga.

History
Already in the early 1970s a women's team played for the German Championship, but was dissolved some years later.

Recreated in 2007, Werder Bremen reached the second national category two years later, after topping the Regionalliga's North group. In the 2. Bundesliga's North group, Werder Bremen was 7th in 2010 and 5th in 2011 and 2012. Bundesliga, by scoring a brace during their opening match against Hamburger SV II to push them to a 2–2 draw.

Finishing second in 2014–15 they were promoted because 1. FC Lübars did not apply for a Bundesliga licence for financial reasons.

Current squad

References

External links

Women's football clubs in Germany
Football clubs in Bremen (state)
Association football clubs established in 2007
Women
2007 establishments in Germany
Frauen-Bundesliga clubs